The 2018–19 season is Denizlispor's 34th season in the TFF First League and their 52nd in existence.

Transfers

In

Out

Squad

|-
|colspan=12 align=center|Players sold or loaned out after the start of the season

Statistics

Friendlies

Pre-season

Mid-season

1. Lig

League table

Results summary

Results by round

Matches

Türkiye Kupası

References

Denizlispor football seasons
Denizlispor